This is a list of player transfers involving Top 14 teams before or during the 2015–16 season. The list is of deals that are confirmed and are either from or to a rugby union team in the Top 14 during the 2014–15 season. It is not unknown for confirmed deals to be cancelled at a later date.

Agen

Players In 
  Benoit Sicart from  Montpellier
  Mike Tadjer from  Massy
  Bautista Guemes from  Club Universitario de Buenos Aires
  Ruaan du Preez from  Oyonnax
  Api Naikatini from  Wellington Lions
  Ropate Ratu from  Aurillac
  Corentin Braendlin from  Toulon
  Johann Sadie from  Cheetahs
  Marc Bahet from  Béziers
  Damien Fèvre from  Pau
  George Tilsley from  New Zealand Sevens
  Dave Ryan from  Ulster

Players Out 
  Benjamin Petre to  CA Brive
  Tariel Ratianidze to  Mont-de–Marsan
  Pierre Ferrary to  Auch
  Semisi Telefoni to  US Carcassonne
  Lucas Tolot to  US Montauban
  Loris Tolot to  US Montauban
  Raphael Lagarde to  SC Albi
  Sergio Valdes retired
  Junior Pelesasa retired
  Wessel Jooste retired
  Denis Fogarty to  Provence
  Belisario Agulla to  Newcastle Falcons

Bordeaux

Players In
  Loann Goujon from  La Rochelle
  Luke Braid from  Blues
  Adam Ashley-Cooper from  NSW Waratahs
  Jean-Marcelin Buttin from  Clermont Auvergne
  Nans Ducuing from  USA Perpignan
  Sekope Kepu from  NSW Waratahs
  Steven Kitshoff from  Stormers
  Jean-Baptiste Dubie from  Mont-de–Marsan
  Peter Saili from  Blues

Players Out
  Ben Venter to  US Montauban
  Bertrand Guiry to  Biarritz Olympique
  Zaza Navrozashvili to  Lyon
  Taiasina Tuifu'a to  Lyon
  Ulrich Beyers to  Zebre
  Laurent Delboubes to  Oyonnax
  Benjamin Sa retired

Brive

Players In
  Benjamin Petre from  SU Agen
  Teddy Iribaren from  Montpellier
  William Whetton from  Castres Olympique
  Joe Snyman from  Scarlets
  Lucas Pointud from  Bayonne
  Matthieu Ugalde from  Bayonne

Players Out
  Pat Barnard retired
  Simon Pinet to  US Montauban
  Olivier Caisso to  US Montauban
  Damien Neveu to  US Colomiers
  Kieran Murphy to  London Welsh
  Venione Voretamaya to  US Colomiers
  Thomas Sanchou retired
  Russlan Boukerou to  Tarbes
  Riaan Swanepoel to  US Montauban
  Aranos Coetzee to

Castres

Players In
  Benjamin Urdapilleta from  Oyonnax
  Alex Tulou from  Montpellier
  Alexandre Bias from  Montpellier
  Rudi Wulf from  Toulon
  Francois Fontaine from  Clermont Auvergne
  David Smith from  Toulon
  Antoine Tichit from  Oyonnax
  Julien Seron from  US Carcassonne
  Lucas Martinez from  Lomas Athletic
  Eric Sione from  Wellington Lions

Players Out
  Rémi Tales to  Racing 92
  William Whetton to  CA Brive
  Ramiro Herrera to  Jaguares
  Cedric Garcia to  US Montauban
  Marcel Garvey to  Provence
  Gregory Marmoiton to  Provence
  Saimone Taumoepeau to  Provence
  Jannie Bornman to  Provence
  Max Evans to  Provence

Clermont

Players In 
  Patricio Fernandez from  Jockey Club
  Scott Spedding from  Bayonne
  Flip van der Merwe from  Bulls
  Camille Gérondeau from  Racing 92
  Judicael Cancoriet from  RC Massy
  Albert Vulivuli from  Montpellier
  Irakli Natriashvili from  SC Tulle
  David Strettle from  Saracens
  Adrien Planté from  Racing 92
  Hosea Gear from  Chiefs

Players Out
  Jean-Marcelin Buttin to  Bordeaux Bègles
  Julien Malzieu to  Montpellier
  Thierry Lacrampe to  Pau
  Mike Delany to  Newcastle Falcons
  Uwa Tawalo to  Oyonnax
  Julien Pierre to  Pau
  Julien Bonnaire to  Lyon
  Zac Guildford to  Hawke's Bay Magpies /  Waratahs
  Napolioni Nalaga to  Lyon
  Ti'i Paulo to  Lyon
  Giorgi Sharashidze to  Aurillac
  Francois Fontaine to  Castres Olympique

Grenoble

Players In 
  Mathias Marie from  Biarritz Olympique
  Lucas Dupont from  Montpellier
  Walter Desmaison from  Racing 92
  Gilles Bosch from  US Carcassonne
  Fabrice Estebanez from  Lyon
  James Percival from  Worcester Warriors
  Stephen Setephano from  NTT DoCoMo Red Hurricanes
  Armand Battle from  US Colomiers
  Sona Taumalolo from  Racing 92
  Christophe Loustalot from  Bayonne
  Rossouw de Klerk from  Glasgow Warriors

Players Out
  Richard Choirat to  Bayonne
  Julien Caminati to  Toulon
  Albertus Buckle to  Lyon
  Florian Faure to  Bourgoin
  Thibaut Rey to  Mont-de-Marsan
  Daniel Kilioni to  US Carcassonne
  Rémy Hughes to  Mont-de-Marsan
  Paul Willemse to  Montpellier
  Jordan Michallat to  Bourgoin
  Geoffroy Messina retired
  Ross Skeate to  Provence
  Naude Beukes to  Bourgoin
  Benjamin Thiery to  Bourgoin
  Alipate Ratini released

La Rochelle

Players In
  Pierre Aguillon from  Oyonnax
  Ricky Januarie from  Lyon
  Maxime Gau from  SC Albi
  Benjamin Lapeyre from  Racing 92
  David Roumieu from  Bayonne
  Damien Lagrange from  Oyonnax
  Gabriel Lacroix from  SC Albi
  Zack Holmes from  Western Force
  David Raikuna from  North Harbour

Players Out
  Loann Goujon to  Bordeaux Bègles
  Jean-Philippe Grandclaude to  Leucate
  Arthur Cestaro to  Provence
  Julien Berger to  Provence
  Hamish Gard to  Mitsubishi Sagamihara DynaBoars
  Benoit Bourrust retired
  Gonzalo Canale to  Provence
  Sireli Bobo retired
  Peter Grant to  Western Force

Montpellier

Players In
  Marvin O'Connor from  Bayonne
  Nic White from  Brumbies
  Davit Kubriashvili from  Stade Français
  Demetri Catrakilis from  Stormers
  Julien Malzieu from  Clermont Auvergne
  Jacques du Plessis from  Bulls
  Schalk van der Merwe from  Lions
  Jesse Mogg from  Brumbies
  Jacobie Adriaanse from  Scarlets
  Paul Willemse from  Grenoble
  Wiaan Liebenberg from  Bulls
  Cameron Wright from  Sharks
  Seveci Nakailagi unattached
  Pierre Spies from  Bulls
  Bismarck du Plessis from  Sharks
  Jannie du Plessis from  Sharks
  CJ van der Linde from

Players Out
  Benoit Sicart to  SU Agen
  Jonathan Pélissié to  Toulon
  Lucas Dupont to  Grenoble
  Fred Quercy to  US Montauban
  Rene Ranger to  Blues
  Na'ama Leleimalefaga to  Worcester Warriors
  Samisoni Viriviri to  US Montauban
  Yohann Artru to  USA Perpignan
  Teddy Iribaren to  CA Brive
  Thomas Bianchin to  Pau
  Chris King to  Pau
  Emiliano Coria to  Zebre
  David Attoub to  Lyon
  Albert Vulivuli to  Clermont Auvergne
  Alex Tulou to  Castres Olympique
  Alexandre Bias to  Castres Olympique
  Nahuel Lobo to  US Carcassonne
  Maximiliano Bustos retired
  Enzo Selponi to  USA Perpignan
  Wynand Olivier to  Worcester Warriors

Oyonnax

Players In
  Nicky Robinson from  Bristol Rugby
  Horatiu Pungea from  Lyon
  George Robson from  Harlequins
  Thomas Bordes from  Mont-de-Marsan
  Piri Weepu from  London Welsh
  Mickael de Marco from  Lyon
  Uwa Tawalo from  Clermont Auvergne
  Quentin Etienne from  RC Narbonne
  Eamonn Sheridan from  London Irish
  Pierrick Gunther from  Lyon
  Fetu'u Vainikolo from  Exeter Chiefs
  Vincent Martin from  Lyon
  Jérémie Maurouard from  Racing 92
  Fabrice Metz from  Racing 92
  Joe Tuineau from  Lyon
  Laurent Delboubes from  Bordeaux Begles
  Shay Kerry from  Worcester Warriors

Players Out
  Neil Clark retired
  Thibault Lassalle to  Toulon
  Benjamin Urdapilleta to  Castres Olympique
  Pierre Aguillon to  La Rochelle
  Ruaan du Preez to  SU Agen
  Clement Biocco retired
  Antoine Guillamon to  Toulouse
  Clément Jullien to  US Carcassonne
  Yohan Domenech to  US Carcassonne
  Paul Ngauamo to  Mont-de-Marsan
  Alex Luatua to  Aurillac
  Agustin Figuerola to  Lyon
  Jean-Francois Coux to  Bourgoin
  Christophe Andre to  USA Perpignan
  Damien Lagrange to  La Rochelle
  Antoine Tichit to  Castres Olympique
  Damian Browne retired

Pau

Players In
  Thierry Lacrampe from  Clermont Auvergne
  Conrad Smith from  Hurricanes
  Sean Dougall from  Munster
  Julien Pierre from  Clermont Auvergne
  Charly Malie from  Montauban
  Thomas Bianchin from  Montpellier
  Chris King from  Montpellier
  Colin Slade from  Crusaders
  Watisoni Votu from  Perpignan
  Mosese Ratuvou from  Lyon
  Pierre Dupouy from  Auch
  Euan Murray from  Glasgow Warriors
  Paddy Butler from  Munster
  Santiago Fernandez from  Bayonne

Players Out
  Antoine Lescalmel to  US Montauban
  Jean-Baptiste Barrère to  Béziers
  Clément Bourgeois to  US Montauban
  Peni Fakelau to  Bourgoin
  Mickael Drouard to  US Nevers
  Lucas Condou to  SC Albi
  Thomas Toevalu to  Bourgoin
  Marlon Solofuti to  Angoulême

Racing

Players In
  Yannick Nyanga from  Toulouse
  Dan Carter from  Crusaders
  Rémi Tales from  Castres Olympique
  Chris Masoe from  Toulon
  Lisiate Fa'aoso from  Bayonne
  Manuel Carizza from  Stormers
  Ben Tameifuna from  Chiefs
  Martin Castrogiovanni from  Toulon
  Akker van der Merwe from  Lions
  Joe Rokocoko from  Bayonne

Players Out
  Johnny Sexton to  Leinster
  Walter Desmaison to  Grenoble
  Camille Gérondeau to  Clermont Auvergne
  Laurent Magnaval to  Biarritz Olympique
  Tomás Lavanini to  Jaguares
  Jamie Roberts to  Harlequins
  Benjamin Lapeyre to  La Rochelle
  Jérémie Maurouard to  Oyonnax
  Fabrice Metz to  Oyonnax
  Adrien Planté to  Clermont Auvergne
  Sona Taumalolo to  Grenoble
  Maxime Javaux to  Provence
  Brian Mujati to  Sale Sharks

Stade Français

Players In
  Paul Alo-Emile from  Melbourne Rebels
  Patrick Sio from  Eastwood
  Emmanuel Felsina from  Lyon
  Avenisi Vasuinubu from  US Colomiers
  Will Genia from  Queensland Reds
  Sekou Macalou from  RC Massy
  Willem Alberts from  Sharks

Players Out
  Romain Frou to  US Nevers
  Nicolas Garrault to  Tarbes
  Davit Kubriashvili to  Montpellier
  Scott LaValla retired
  Pierre Rabadan retired
  Jerome Fillol retired
  Santiago García Botta to  Jaguares
  Richard Kingi retired
  David Lyons retired
  Krisnan Inu to  Catalans Dragons
  Digby Ioane to  Honda Heat

Toulon

Players In
  Ma'a Nonu from  Hurricanes
  Jonathan Pélissié from  Montpellier
  Thibault Lassalle from  Oyonnax
  Salesi Ma'afu from  Northampton Saints
  Samu Manoa from  Northampton Saints
  Mohamed Boughanmi from  Béziers
  Julien Caminati from  Grenoble
  James O'Connor from  Queensland Reds
  Quade Cooper from  Queensland Reds
  Charles Ollivon from  Bayonne
  Anthony Etrillard from  Bayonne
  Paul O'Connell from  Munster
  Duane Vermeulen from  Stormers
  Matt Stevens from  Sharks
  Tom Taylor from  Crusaders

Players Out 
  Bakkies Botha retired
  Carl Hayman retired
  Ali Williams retired
  Michael Claassens to  Sharks
  Nicolas Durand to  Lyon
  Chris Masoe to  Racing 92
  Nicolás Sánchez to  Jaguares
  Stéphane Munoz to  Montauban
  Corentin Braendlin to  Agen
  Rudi Wulf to  Castres Olympique
  David Smith to  Castres Olympique
  Martin Castrogiovanni to  Racing 92

Toulouse

Players In
  Semi Kunatani from  Fiji Sevens
  Gert Muller from  Bayonne
  David Mele from  Leicester Tigers

Players Out
  Yannick Nyanga to  Racing 92
  Jano Vermaak to  Stormers
  Dorian Aldegheri to  US Carcassonne
  Loic Verdy to  Provence
  Francois Bouvier to  SU Agen
  Schalk Ferreira to

See also
 List of 2015–16 Premiership Rugby transfers
 List of 2015–16 RFU Championship transfers
 List of 2015–16 Pro12 transfers
 List of 2015–16 Super Rugby transfers
 List of 2015 SuperLiga transfers

References

2015-16
2015–16 Top 14 season